Yulia Slesarchik (born 25 August 1994) is a Belarusian footballer who plays as a defender for Belarusian Premier League club Dinamo Minsk and the Belarus women's national team.

Honours 
Zorka-BDU
Winner
 Belarusian Women's Cup: 2012
 Belarusian Women's Super Cup: 2013

Runner-up
 Belarusian Premier League (2): 2014, 2015
 Belarusian Women's Cup (2): 2014, 2015
 Belarusian Women's Super Cup: 2015

References

External links 
 

1994 births
Living people
Women's association football defenders
Belarusian women's footballers
People from Minsk District
Belarus women's international footballers
FC Minsk (women) players
FC Dinamo Minsk players
Sportspeople from Minsk Region